Complete History Volume One is a compilation album by the Washington, D.C. hardcore punk band Government Issue, compiling the band's recordings from 1982 to 1985. It was released March 28, 2000 through Dr. Strange Records, with a companion album, Complete History Volume Two, released in 2002. Together, the two Complete History albums collect nearly all of the band's recorded output. Volume One intentionally omits the 1981 Legless Bull EP and the tracks "Hey Ronnie" and "Lie, Cheat, and Steal" released on the Flex Your Head compilation, as both of these releases are still in print through Dischord Records.

Track listing 
All songs written and composed by Government Issue, except where noted.

Disc 1

Disc 2

Personnel

Band 
 John Stabb – lead vocals (all tracks)
 Marc Alberstadt – drums (all tracks)
 Tom Lyle – bass guitar (tracks 1–5 on disc 1), guitar (tracks 6–45 on disc 1), producer (tracks 1–5 and 23–35 on disc 1, tracks 23–35 on disc 2)
 Brian Baker – guitar (tracks 1–5 on disc 1), producer (tracks 1–5 and 23–45 on disc 1, tracks 1–5 and 23–35 on disc 2)
 Mitch Parker – bass guitar (tracks 6–22 on disc 1)
 Mike Fellows – bass guitar (tracks 23–35 on disc 1, tracks 13, 14, and 17 on disc 2)
 Lenny Leonard – bass guitar (tracks 36–45 on disc 1, tracks 1–5, 7–11, 16, 18, 23, 25–32, 34, and 35 on disc 2)
 Rob Moss – bass guitar (tracks 12 and 21 on disc 2)
 Mitch Parker – bass guitar (tracks 19 and 20 on disc 2)
 Steve Hansgen – bass guitar (tracks 24 and 33 on disc 2)

Production 
 Tom Scott – recording engineer (all tracks on disc 1, tracks 1–5 on disc 2), producer (tracks 23–35 on disc 1), remix engineer (tracks 36–45 on disc 1, tracks 1–5 on disc 2)
 Ian MacKaye – producer and backing vocals (tracks 6–17 on disc 1)
 Don Zientara – recording engineer (tracks 6–17 on disc 1)
 Barbara Milne – recording engineer (tracks 36–45 on disc 1, tracks 1–5 on disc 2)
 Steve Carr – recording engineer (tracks 36–45 on disc 1, tracks 1–5 on disc 2)
 Jim Fox – recording engineer (tracks 23–35 on disc 2)
 Phillip Roves – recording engineer (tracks 23–35 on disc 2)
 Chris Biondo – recording and remix engineer (tracks 23–35 on disc 2)
 Doug Johnston – recording engineer for this compilation
 Jeff Caudill – art direction and design

References 

2000 compilation albums
Government Issue albums